Saint Joseph Academy or similar may refer to:

India
St Joseph's Academy, Dehradun, Uttarakhand

Philippines
Saint Joseph's Academy (Las Piñas)
Saint Joseph's Academy (Mandaue, Cebu)

United Kingdom
Saint Joseph's Academy, Kilmarnock

United States
Saint Joseph Academy (San Marcos, California)
St. Joseph Academy (St. Augustine area, Florida)
St. Joseph's Academy, now St. Theresa School (Coral Gables, Florida)
St. Joseph's Academy (Baton Rouge), Louisiana
Saint Joseph's Academy (Saint Paul, Minnesota)
St. Joseph's Academy (St. Louis), Missouri
Academy of Saint Joseph in Brentwood, New York
Saint Joseph Academy (Cleveland, Ohio)
Saint Joseph Academy (Brownsville, Texas) 
St. Joseph's Academy (Laredo, Texas)

See also
Mount Saint Joseph Academy (disambiguation)